Strawberry Hill is an historic farmstead located in a rural area within the town of Rhinebeck, New York. It contains several contributing structures, including an eighteenth-century farmhouse, a Dutch barn complex, a well, a wellhouse, an outhouse, and two sheds. The property is characterized by a mix of wooded terrain and open fields. It became a National Register of Historic Places listing on July 9, 1987.

See also

National Register of Historic Places listings in Rhinebeck, New York

References

Houses completed in 1762
National Register of Historic Places in Dutchess County, New York
Houses in Rhinebeck, New York